Colyn C. Fischer (born 1977 in Pittsburgh, Pennsylvania) is an American violinist that has played the violin since the age of three and has been Scottish fiddling since the age of five. As a teenager,  he studied with a number of the great fiddlers of Scotland, such as Ian Powrie and Alasdair Hardy, and of the United States, including John Turner and Bonnie Rideout. He holds a Bachelor of Music Performance in Violin from Wheaton College, Illinois, and has recorded with various ensembles in genres including jazz, classical, rock and Scottish.

In 1993, Fischer won the American National Scottish Fiddling championship (Jr. Div.), and won in the Open category in 2005 (in Houston, Texas) and again in 2006 (in Ohio).

Fischer lives in San Francisco, California, teaching middle school orchestra in the San Carlos School District. He is a private violin-fiddle instructor and also teaches at the annual Jink and Diddle School of Scottish Fiddling. He performs regularly with pianist Shauna Pickett-Gordon.

Discography
New and Traditional Tunes in the Scottish Style 
Colyn Fischer – fiddle, bodhran, vocals
Joshua Carns – guitar
The Light of Day
Colyn Fischer - fiddle
Shauna Pickett-Gordon - piano
Nocturne
Colyn Fischer - violin
Shauna Pickett-Gordon - piano
Sounding
Colyn Fischer - violin
Shauna Pickett-Gordon - piano

References

Brokenbek, Michelle (July 11, 2007). "Local fiddler found success at national level with Scottish style" Penn-Trafford Star.
Dobranski, Patti (July 27, 2007). "Celtic music's underlying story fascinates P-T fiddler". Tribune-Review.
Wertz, Marjorie (July 15, 2005). "Living History Days to feature Scottish fiddling champ". Tribune-Review.
 Stacy Trevenon (August 11, 2009) "From Highlands to Coastside". Half Moon Bay Review.

External links
Scots Duo official website

American fiddlers
Living people
Musicians from Pittsburgh
Wheaton College (Illinois) alumni
American male violinists
1977 births
21st-century American violinists
21st-century American male musicians